Francisco Santiago Beltrame Echeverría (born 1952 in Montevideo) is a Uruguayan architect and politician.

Graduated at the University of the Republic, he specialized in housing cooperatives. Afterwards he worked at MEVIR (organization in charge of eradicating unhealthy rural houses).

In 2012 he was appointed Minister of Housing, Territorial Planning and Environment, replacing the previous office holder Graciela Muslera.

See also
 Cabinet of Uruguay

References

Living people
1952 births
University of the Republic (Uruguay) alumni
Uruguayan architects
Broad Front (Uruguay) politicians
Ministers of Housing, Territorial Planning and Environment of Uruguay